Rhagovelia distincta is a species of smaller water strider in the family Veliidae. It is found in Central America and North America.

References

External links

 

Veliidae
Articles created by Qbugbot
Insects described in 1898